David M. Sanko is the executive director of the Pennsylvania State Association of Township Supervisors (PSATS) near Harrisburg, Pennsylvania. Sanko has held this position since January 2010. From January 2005 through December 2009, Sanko was the chief operating officer for Bucks County, in southeast Pennsylvania—considered a suburb of Philadelphia. From 2003 through the beginning of 2005, Sanko was a member of (Democratic) Governor Ed Rendell's cabinet as the director of the Pennsylvania Emergency Management Agency (PEMA). Sanko successfully directed Pennsylvania's emergency response and recovery operations through multiple presidential declared disasters, including the floods of Hurricane Ivan. Prior to his directorship at PEMA, he was chief of staff for (Republican) Governor Mark Schweiker during both Schweiker's governorship and lieutenant governorship. Prior public service includes Deputy Auditor General, Commonwealth of Pennsylvania 1992–1994 and Chief of Staff to PA Senate Senate Majority Leader 1982–83. Sanko is a graduate of East Stroudsburg University. He served from 2003 to 2004.

References

Living people
State cabinet secretaries of Pennsylvania
Year of birth missing (living people)